Assunta Spina  is a 1930 Italian silent drama film directed by Roberto Roberti and starring Rina De Liguoro and Febo Mari. It is based on the play of the same title by Salvatore Di Giacomo.

Plot
Assunta, a commoner of Naples, is scarred by her lover Michele for jealousy.

Cast 
 Rina De Liguoro as Assunta Spina
 Febo Mari as Michele Boccadifuoco
 Elio Steiner
 Alfredo Martinelli
 Carlos Montes
 Cellio Bucchi
 Goffredo D'Andrea

References

External links 
 

1930 films
1930s Italian-language films
Films directed by Roberto Roberti
Italian silent films
1930 drama films
Italian drama films
Italian films based on plays
Italian black-and-white films
Silent drama films
1930s Italian films